Samuel Harding may refer to:
Samuel Harding (American football) (1873–1919), American college football coach
Samuel Harding (cabinetmaker) (died 1758), American craftsman
Sam Harding (rugby union), New Zealand rugby union player